Hans Oskar Richard Hessling (March 22, 1903 – February 24, 1995) was a German film and television actor.

Selected filmography
 Joan of Arc (1935)
 Nights in Andalusia (1938)
 The Heart of a Queen (1940)
 Corinna Schmidt (1951)
 Have Sunshine in Your Heart (1953)
 Before God and Man (1955)
 Night of Decision (1956)
 The Night of the Storm (1957)
 The Buddenbrooks (1959)
 Sacred Waters (1960)
 The Last Pedestrian (1960)
 Max the Pickpocket (1962)
 The Priest of St. Pauli (1970)

References

External links
 

1903 births
1995 deaths
German male film actors
German male television actors
Male actors from Munich
20th-century German male actors